A general election was held in Virginia in 2014.

Elections 

 2014 Virginia ballot measures
 2014 United States House of Representatives elections in Virginia
 2014 Virginia's 7th congressional district special election
 2014 United States Senate election in Virginia
 2014 Norfolk mayoral election

See also 

 Elections in Virginia

2014 Virginia elections
Virginia